Volkswagen 1500 may refer to one of four automobiles:

 A variant of the Volkswagen Beetle
 A variant of the Volkswagen Type 3
 The Volkswagen 1500 Karmann Ghia
 The rebranded version of Hillman Avenger produced by Volkswagen Argentina between 1982 and 1988.

1500